The Bosnia and Herzegovina Chess Championship is the national chess championship of Bosnia and Herzegovina. It was first organised in 2005 by the BIH Chess Union; more than ten years after its independence from Yugoslavia. In the first edition there were six players from Bosnia and Herzegovina and six players from Serbia and Montenegro. The first edition was marked by the absence of leading players such as Borki Predojević, Bojan Kurajica and Emir Dizdarević. The second edition was played with 10 players from Bosnia and Herzegovina and two players from Serbia and Montenegro. The field in the third edition consisted entirely of Bosnia and Herzegovina chess players. With Borki Predojević and Predrag Nikolić participating, it was the strongest edition so far.

Winners
{| class="sortable wikitable"
! # !! Year !! City !! Champion 
|-
| 1 || 2005 || Brčko || 
|-
| 2 || 2006 || Vitez || 
|-
| 3 || 2007 || Sarajevo || 
|-
| 4 || 2010 || Široki Brijeg || 
|-
| 5 || 2011 || Cazin || 
|-
| 6 || 2012 || Neum || 
|-
| 7 || 2013 || Cazin || 
|-
| 8 || 2014 || Zenica || 
|-
| 9 || 2016 || Lukavac || 
|}

Women

{| class="sortable wikitable"
!Year !! City !! Champion 
|-
| 2008 ||Ilidža||Elena Borić
|}

See also
Yugoslav Chess Championship

External links
 Reports on the 2005 edition: TWIC, chesslodge
 Reports on the 2006 edition: Bichess.com
 Reports on the 2007 edition: TWIC, Bichess.com

Chess national championships
Women's chess national championships
Championship
Chess